Bassot is a French surname. Notable people with the surname include:

Jean Michel Bassot (born 1959), French footballer
Sylvia Bassot (1940–2014), French politician

See also
Basset (surname)

French-language surnames